Cabixi is a municipality located in the Brazilian state of Rondônia. Its population was 5,188 (2020) and its area is 1,314 km². It is the southernmost city in Rondônia.

References

Municipalities in Rondônia